The Kings Theatre was a theatre and latterly a cinema in the town of Kilmarnock in what is now East Ayrshire.

The Kings Theatre opened in Titchfield Street in October 1904. When Cinemas opened in the town the Kings Theatre was forced to become a cinema but they also still showed live performances.

On 17 December 1934 the Kings Theatre became the Regal Cinema. The cinema remained open until recently when it was forced to close due to declining trade after the opening of a new cinema, The Odeon, situated at the Queens Drive. The building which housed the Kings Theatre is currently empty.

Theatres in Kilmarnock